is a Japanese Paralympic cross-country skier and biathlete. He is regarded as one of the most experienced Japanese Paralympic competitors as he went onto represent Japan at the Paralympics in 1998, 2002, 2006, 2010, 2014, 2018 and 2022. Yoshihiro Nitta has clinched 4 medals in his Paralympic career including 2 gold medals at the 2010 Winter Paralympics. He achieved his 4th Paralympic medal in his career and the first medal since the 2010 Winter Paralympics after claiming a silver medal in the men's 1.5km sprint classic standing cross-country skiing event during the 2018 Winter Paralympics.

Biography 
As a child, his left arm was amputated at the age of 3 below the elbow after it was found evident that his left arm was caught in a combine harvest which was driven by his grandfather. He took the sport of skiing at the age of nine. He took the sport in the third grade of his elementary school. He graduated at the University of Tsukuba.

Career 
Yoshihiro Nitta made his Paralympic debut for Japan during the 1998 Winter Paralympics but went medalless in his maiden Paralympic event. He clinched his first Paralympic medal which was a bronze medal in the men's 5km classic style event as a part of the 2002 Winter Paralympics. Yoshihiro made his reputation at the 2010 Winter Paralympics claiming 2 gold medals in the 1km sprint classic standing and 10km classic style events.

Yoshihiro Nitta represented 2018 Winter Paralympics representing Japan, making it as his 6th consecutive Winter Paralympic event since making his debut in 1998. He claimed his first Paralympic gold medal in 8 years by securing gold in the men's cross-country 10km classical skiing event during the 2018 Winter Paralympics taking 24 minutes and 6.8 seconds.

He underwent a rehab after spraining his left ankle which he endured during a training session in August 2021. He insisted that he was inspired to train hard and prepare himself for 2022 Winter Paralympics after watching the passion of athletes through television who took part in 2020 Summer Paralympics amid the COVID-19 triggered bogged buildup for the competition. He represented Japan at the 2022 Winter Paralympics which also remarkably marked his 7th consecutive Winter Paralympic event and he achieved it at the age of 41.

References

External links 
 

1980 births
Living people
Japanese male cross-country skiers
Japanese male biathletes
Paralympic cross-country skiers of Japan
Paralympic biathletes of Japan
Paralympic gold medalists for Japan
Paralympic silver medalists for Japan
Paralympic bronze medalists for Japan
Biathletes at the 1998 Winter Paralympics
Biathletes at the 2002 Winter Paralympics
Biathletes at the 2010 Winter Paralympics
Cross-country skiers at the 1998 Winter Paralympics
Cross-country skiers at the 2002 Winter Paralympics
Cross-country skiers at the 2006 Winter Paralympics
Cross-country skiers at the 2010 Winter Paralympics
Cross-country skiers at the 2014 Winter Paralympics
Cross-country skiers at the 2018 Winter Paralympics
Cross-country skiers at the 2022 Winter Paralympics
Medalists at the 2002 Winter Paralympics
Medalists at the 2010 Winter Paralympics
Medalists at the 2018 Winter Paralympics
Sportspeople from Okayama Prefecture
University of Tsukuba alumni
Paralympic medalists in cross-country skiing
21st-century Japanese people